Talikha is a rural locality (a khutor) in Zilairsky Selsoviet, Zilairsky District, Bashkortostan, Russia. The population was 9 as of 2010. There is 1 street.

Geography 
Talikha is located 19 km northwest of Zilair (the district's administrative centre) by road. Saratovsky is the nearest rural locality.

References 

Rural localities in Zilairsky District